Sébastien Britten (born May 17, 1970) is a Canadian former competitive figure skater. He won bronze medals at three senior internationals — the 1992 International de Paris, the 1993 Nations Cup and the 1994 Skate Canada International — and became the Canadian national champion in 1995. Britten represented Canada at the 1994 Winter Olympics, where he placed 10th. He competed at three World Championships, achieving his best result, eighth, in 1994.

In 1998, Britten beat several Olympic and World medallists to win the 1998 World Professional Figure Skating Championships held in Jaca, Spain. Following his retirement from competitive skating, he began working as a  coach and choreographer.

Programs

Competitive highlights
GP: Champions Series (Grand Prix)

1990–1997

Novice and junior career

References

 
 

1970 births
Canadian male single skaters
Figure skaters at the 1994 Winter Olympics
Living people
Olympic figure skaters of Canada
People from Verdun, Quebec
Figure skaters from Montreal